OlliOlli2: Welcome to Olliwood is a skateboarding video game developed and published by Roll7 for the PlayStation 4 and PlayStation Vita. The game was announced on 25 September 2014 as the sequel to the critically acclaimed OlliOlli, and was released on 3 March 2015 in North America and on 4 March 2015 in the PAL region. OlliOlli2 was released free to PlayStation Plus members. The game was ported to PC by BlitWorks and published by Devolver Digital, releasing it for Microsoft Windows, OS X, and Linux on 11 August 2015.

On 22 February 2016, OlliOlli2 was released for Android on the Google Play Store. On 9 April 2016, it was announced that Roll7 cooperated with Spanish publisher and distributor Badland Games to bring OlliOlli and OlliOlli2: Welcome to Olliwood to retail stores, delivered as OlliOlli: Epic Combo Edition for PlayStation 4. The game was later ported to Xbox One under the title OlliOlli2: XL Edition on 24 May 2016. A sequel, OlliOlli World, was released in 2022.

Reception

The game received "favourable" reviews on all platforms according to the review aggregation website Metacritic.

Over 1 million people have downloaded the game as of 27 March 2015.

References

External links
 
 

2015 video games
Android (operating system) games
BlitWorks games
Devolver Digital games
Indie video games
Linux games
MacOS games
Multiplayer and single-player video games
PhyreEngine games
PlayStation 4 games
PlayStation Network games
PlayStation Vita games
Roll7 games
Skateboarding video games
Team17 games
Video game sequels
Video games developed in the United Kingdom
Windows games
Xbox One games